is a 1984 mahjong video game developed by Hudson Soft and published by Nintendo for the Famicom. It was released exclusively in Japan. It is the second mahjong game published by Nintendo.

Gameplay 

The game consists of Japanese mahjong (also known as riichi mahjong) against one to three computer opponents. Spreading to most mahjong-related video games after this one, it has become the most widely accepted form of mahjong to the Japanese gamer. The "tiles remaining counter" served as a reminder to players about the status of the wall.

Reception 
1,450,000 copies have been sold in Japan.

Notes

References 

1984 video games
Hudson Soft games
Japan-exclusive video games
Nintendo Entertainment System games
Nintendo Entertainment System-only games
Mahjong video games
Video games developed in Japan